The Long March 4B, also known as the Chang Zheng 4B, CZ-4B, and LM-4B, is a Chinese expendable orbital Launch vehicle. Launched from Launch Complex 1 at the Taiyuan Satellite Launch Center, it is a 3-stage launch vehicle, used mostly to place satellites into low Earth orbit and Sun-synchronous orbits. It was first launched on 10 May 1999, with the FY-1C weather satellite, which would later be used in the 2007 Chinese anti-satellite missile test.

The Chang Zheng 4B experienced its only launch failure on 9 December 2013, with the loss of the CBERS-3 satellite.

Launch Statistics

List of launches

See also
 Long March 4C
 Long March (rocket family)
 Medium-lift launch vehicle

References 

Long March (rocket family)